Watheroo is a small town in the Wheatbelt region of Western Australia.

History
Land in the area was settled by James Oliver in 1851, the area was surveyed in 1871 and the name Watheroo was charted for the first time. Watheroo is a thriving farming Wheatbelt town, farming livestock and grain. The town was an original station on the Midland Railway Company railway line to Walkaway. The townsite was gazetted in 1907.

Railway
Following flooding along the Moore River in 1907, the railway lines between Watheroo and Moora were closed for some time when parts of the track were washed away. Rail services were again affected in 1917 when  of rain fell in three hours causing more flooding, washways and the railyard in town to be submerged.

Etymology
The name is Indigenous Australian in origin and was the name of a nearby spring. The word Watheroo is derived from the word wardo which means little bird or more specifically the willy wagtail or from the word wardoro which means water.

Climate

References

External links 

Towns in Western Australia
Wheatbelt (Western Australia)
Grain receival points of Western Australia